Yasmin Frances Kaashoek (born 3 March 1999) is a British volleyball player, a member of the England women's national junior volleyball team and Wessex Volleyball Club, a competitor at the CEV U18 European Beach Volleyball Championships and Inaugural World U17 Beach Volleyball Championships where she alongside Anaya Evans became the first England duo to finish top-10 in an international competition.

Personal life
Yasmin was born in Devizes to Hans Kaashoek. She has a younger brother aged fifteen who plays football in his school years.

Career
Yasmin found volleyball and began playing for Devizes Volleyball from a young age. Her passion and talent grew and was noticed by coaches at regional training. Yasmin was selected to represent the South West in the Inter-Regional Competition which caught scouts’ eyes. Yasmin soon was further selected to train with the England Cadets well as the England Junior Beach Squad winning her first international caps months later.
Yasmin moved to LeAF Elite Athlete Academy to join the volleyball programme alongside other national junior greats.

National championships

 2015/2016  Volleyball England National U18 Indoor Volleyball Championship, with Wessex LeAF Volleyball
 2015/2016  Volleyball England National U18 Grand Prix, with Wessex LeAF Volleyball

National team
 NEVZA U17 Indoor Volleyball Championships
 NEZVA U19 Indoor Volleyball Championships
 World U17 Beach Volleyball Championships
 CEV U18 European Beach Volleyball Championships

Individually
 2014 Super 6 at the Sainsbury’s School Games

References

External links
 Beach Volleyball Database
 
 FIVB World Tour Profile
 Bournemouth Echo
 Gazette and Herald
 North Devon Journal

1999 births
Living people
English women's volleyball players
English women's beach volleyball players
Sportspeople from Devizes
Sportspeople from Bournemouth
Opposite hitters